Mom and Dad Save the World is a 1992 American science fiction comedy film directed by Greg Beeman. Jon Lovitz plays Emperor Tod Spengo, who is the cruel, silly, and over-dramatic emperor of the planet named Spengo. Teri Garr plays Marge Nelson and Jeffrey Jones plays Dick Nelson, her husband. The film also stars Eric Idle and Thalmus Rasulala. Rasulala died shortly after completing his scenes, and the film is dedicated to his memory.

Plot
Emperor Tod Spengo (Jon Lovitz), with General Afir (Thalmus Rasulala) at his side, takes over a small planet at the edge of the galaxy populated entirely by idiots, and renames it after himself. He has all the resources of the planet engaged to create his "Super Death Ray Laser" to destroy Earth, thus making Spengo the greatest planet in the Universe. When Spengo peeks at the laser's planned point of impact (a Southern California suburb), he beholds housewife Marge Nelson (Teri Garr) and instantly falls in love. Using his Magnobeam (a giant magnet), he kidnaps Marge and her husband Dick (Jeffrey Jones) on their way to their 20th-anniversary weekend, hoping to make Marge his wife.

Dick and Marge get separated on Spengo: Marge is sent to the lap of luxury, waited on by servants with fish or bulldog heads, while Dick is thrown into a dungeon. In his cell, Dick meets the rightful king of Spengo, King Raff (Eric Idle), who gives him plans for his son, called the White Bird, leader of a band of rebels out in the desert. In the meantime, Spengo finds that his advances towards Marge are failing, so he tries to read Dick's mind in order to discover the secret to her heart before having him executed. Upon witnessing Dick's devotion to Marge, Spengo's interrogator, Sibor (Wallace Shawn), has a change of heart and helps Dick escape. Despite the stupidity of his captors, Dick is soon discovered and forced down a garbage chute to the sewers, where he encounters a pack of carnivorous mushroom-like creatures called Lub-Lubs and is forced to run for his life.

Dick manages to escape the sewers and steal an escape pod, and winds up crashing in the desert, where he meets the rebels led by King Raff's son, Prince Sirk (Dwier Brown), and daughter, 
Princess Semage (Kathy Ireland), all of whom dress as 6-foot-tall birds (although such creatures are not naturally found on Spengo). At first, the rebels don't trust Dick, but when Dick reveals that he shared a cell with Raff and that he is on their side, their attitude quickly changes, and Dick rises to the rank of war leader. Using what limited resources he can scrounge up, he devises a plan to sneak back into Spengo's palace and save Marge. In the meantime, General Afir, the only intelligent person among Spengo's forces and resentful of his emperor's antics, believes that Dick and Marge are the key to ending Spengo's rule, so he switches the love serum meant for Marge with water and informs her of his intentions to recover Dick. However, Spengo overhears Afir's plan and has him placed in the barrel of the laser, to die when the weapon is fired at Earth.

While Spengo's wedding with Marge is prepared, a detachment of Spengo's soldiers go into the desert to finish the rebels, but find their camp deserted, and one by one they fall victim to a light grenade (which has "pick me up" engraved on it and disintegrates anyone who picks it up) left on Dick's pallet. Simultaneously, Dick and the rebels approach Spengo's fortress inside a large wooden bust of Spengo, which Spengo has brought into the chapel, and in the midst of the wedding ceremony the rebels emerge from the Trojan bust. As fighting rages in the castle, Spengo retreats to his lab with Marge and prepares to fire the laser at Earth. Dick and Tod clash with swords, but neither gains the upper hand. Marge manages to free herself and helps Dick throw Spengo into the sewers, where he is last seen being cornered by the Lub-Lubs. At the last second, Dick and Marge manage to shut down the laser, saving Afir and the Earth.

With Tod defeated, Raff is reinstated as the rightful king, and he reverses the polarity on the Magnobeam to send Dick and Marge back to Earth. Upon arriving home, Dick and Marge proceed to show their son (Danny Cooksey), daughter (Suzanne Ventulett), and her boyfriend Carl (Michael Stoyanov) slides (including an image of their space journey to Planet Spengo) from what they claim is "Santa Barbara". To end their anniversary, they share drinks on the roof, watching the stars.

Cast
 Teri Garr as Marge Nelson
 Jeffrey Jones as Dick Nelson
 Jon Lovitz as Emperor Tod Spengo
 Thalmus Rasulala as General Afir
 Wallace Shawn as Sibor
 Eric Idle as King Raff
 Dwier Brown as Sirk, the White Bird
 Kathy Ireland as Semage
 Suzanne Ventulett as Stephanie Nelson
 Michael Stoyanov as Carl
 Danny Cooksey as Alan Nelson
 Tony Cox as Blaaatt
 Jeff Doucette as Captain Destroyer
 Jonathan Stark as Lieutenant Destroyer
 Brent Hinkley as Throne Room Destroyer
 Dan Stanton as Twin Destroyers
 Laurie Main as Chorus Master

Reception
The film received negative critical reviews and was a box office bomb. It opened in 904 theatres and grossed only $984,627 in its opening weekend. The following weekend it dropped nearly 70% and was withdrawn from distribution after a gross of $2 million. On Rotten Tomatoes, the film holds a rating of 12% from 25 reviews with the consensus: "There is no saving this off-putting family adventure from its mirthless script, although some inspired production design gives it some visual polish."

References

External links
 
 
 
 

1992 films
1990s adventure films
1990s science fiction comedy films
American science fiction comedy films
American space adventure films
American children's comedy films
Alien abduction films
Apocalyptic films
Puppet films
Films scored by Jerry Goldsmith
Films directed by Greg Beeman
Films set on fictional planets
Films with screenplays by Ed Solomon
Warner Bros. films
HBO Films films
1992 comedy films
Films with screenplays by Chris Matheson (screenwriter)
Films about royalty
1990s English-language films
1990s American films